The Höegh Esperanza is a Floating Storage and Regasification Unit (FSRU) ship owned by Höegh LNG Holdings. From the end of 2022 the FSRU will be used in the Wilhelmshaven LNG terminal.

History 
The FSRU ship was ordered on June 1, 2015, from Hyundai Heavy Industries in South Korea, the keel was layed on December 28, 2015 and was launched on March 17, 2017. The ship was delivered to its owner on April 5, 2018. In June 2018, it was chartered for three years by CNOOC Gas & Power Trading and Marketing and was used starting in November 2018 at the Port of Tianjin.

In 2019, plans were made for the ship to be used for ten years by the Australian energy company AGL Energy in the planned LNG terminal Crib Point (Mornington-Halbinsel south of Melbourne). However, the terminal project was not approved by regulatory authorities in March 2021 for environmental reasons.

Use in Wilhelmshaven 
On May 5, 2022, Höegh LNG Holdings announced that it has signed binding implementation contracts with the German Federal Ministry for Economic Affairs and Climate Action for the chartering of two FSRUs from the Hoegh fleet for operation in Germany for ten years. The detailed FSRU contracts were expected to be finalized by September/October 2022 and by November 2022, FSRU operations were expected to start at the end of the year at the Wilhelmshaven LNG terminal by use of the Höegh Esperanza.

Description 
The vessel is measured at 110,499 GT with a length of 290 m and a breadth of 46 m and has a deadweight tonnage of 92,217 tdw. For propulsion, the Höegh Esperanza was equipped with a dual-fuel diesel-electric system consisting of four dual-fuel Wärtsilä-Italia W8L50DF engines, each with eight cylinders and 500 mm bore and 580 mm stroke, and a rated power of 7800 kW. As emergency diesel engine a Cummins KTA 38D is used as backup.

The vessel was designed for combined open and closed regasification operation and the GTT Mark III membrane tanks have a storage capacity of 170,000 m³ of liquefied natural gas. Two auxiliary boilers and four exhaust boilers were installed for good heat utilization. The ship has been classified by the ship classification society DNV.

References 

Ships of Norway
Tankers
 Floating liquefied natural gas terminals